Poteet Independent School District is a public school district based in Poteet, in the U.S. state of Texas. In 2009, the school district was rated "academically acceptable" by the Texas Education Agency.

Schools
In the 2012-2013 school year, the district had students in five schools.
Regular instructional schools
 Poteet High School (Grades 9–12)
 Poteet Junior High School (Grades 6–8)
 Poteet Intermediate School (Grades 4–5)
 Poteet Elementary School (Grades EE–3)
Alternative instructional schools
 Atascosa County Juvenile Unit (Grades 6-12)

References

External links
 

School districts in Atascosa County, Texas